Calostemmateae are a very small tribe of subfamily Amaryllidoideae (family Amaryllidaceae). They are herbaceous monocot perennial flowering plants endemic to Australasia. The tribe consists of two genera, Proiphys and Calostemma.

The placement of Calostemmateae within subfamily Amaryllidoideae is shown in the 
following cladogram:

References

Bibliography

External links 

Amaryllidoideae
Monocot tribes